Atopodentatus is an extinct genus of basal sauropterygian known from the early Middle Triassic (Pelsonian substage, Anisian to Ladinian stage) of Luoping County, Yunnan Province, southwestern China. It contains a single species, Atopodentatus unicus. It is thought to have lived between 247 and 240 million years ago, during the Middle Triassic period, about six million years after the Permian extinction. Atopodentatus was an herbivorous marine reptile, although marine reptiles are usually omnivores or carnivores.

A near complete skeleton along with a left lateral portion of the skull were discovered near Daaozi village, Yunnan, China. The scientific name derives from the peculiar zipper-shaped morphology of the holotype specimen's jaws and unique dentition. However, two fossil skulls discovered in 2016 indicate that the holotype skull was badly damaged, and that the living animal actually had a hammer-shaped head with shovel-like jaws.

Description

The geological strata in which the fossil was found, the elongated body, reduced neck, robust appendages and hips of Atopodentatus all suggest that the reptile was probably semi-aquatic in nature.

Originally, the upper mandible of Atopodentatus was believed to have small teeth running along the jawline, and then up along a vertical split in the middle of the upper jaw. This gave the upper jaw the appearance of a "zipper smile of little teeth". The upper jaw was believed to have hooked downwards. Discoveries in 2016, however, overthrew these findings, and revealed that Atopodentatus actually had a hammer-shaped head, with a bank of chisel-shaped teeth, that was useful in rooting the seabed for food.

Discovery and naming
The genus name Atopodentatus is derived from the Ancient Greek , meaning "unusual", combined with Latin , "toothed", referring to the unusual arrangement and shape of the teeth. The specific name "unicus" is also in reference to its unique anatomy.

Palaeoecology 
Due to its bizarre dentition, Atopodentatus was formerly considered to be a filter feeder which fed on invertebrates along the sea-bottom. It was suggested that the morphology made Atopodentatus "capable of walking on land or tidal flats and sandy islands in the intertidal zone". However, the 2016 findings reveal that Atopodentatus actually ate algae from the seabed, making it the second known Mesozoic herbivorous marine reptile after the sphenodontian Ankylosphenodon. Atopodentatus is the earliest known herbivorous marine reptile by about 8 million years.

Notes

References

Fossil taxa described in 2014
Middle Triassic reptiles of Asia
Sauropterygian genera
Paleontology in Yunnan
Anisian life